Edholm is a surname. Notable people with the surname include:

Anders Edholm (born 1970), Swedish politician
Conny Edholm, Swedish sprint canoer
Lotten Edholm (1839–1930), Swedish composer
Mary G. Charlton Edholm (1854–1935), American journalist
Otto Edholm (1909–1995), British physiologist
Rafael Edholm (born 1966), Swedish actor

See also
Edholm (disambiguation)